The informal 2024 presidential campaign of Kanye West began in November 2022, when rapper and entrepreneur Kanye West, who is also known by his legal name Ye, confirmed that he is running in the 2024 presidential election while answering paparazzi questions. Neither an exploratory committee nor Federal Election Commission filing exist yet.

As early as December 2016, the rapper, fashion designer, and businessman would repeatedly suggest that he would run for president of the United States in the 2024 United States presidential election. West was previously an independent candidate for president in the 2020 election. West has not announced a party affiliation for this campaign, although his voter registration is Republican.

West garnered significant controversy early in his campaign after identifying as a Nazi, declaring that he "loves" Adolf Hitler, and denying the Holocaust in an interview with far-right conspiracy theorist Alex Jones. "I love Jewish people, but I also love Nazis," he said. Shortly after the interview, West went on to tweet a photo of a swastika intertwined with a Star of David, resulting in his second suspension from Twitter. On December 5, 2022, far-right commentator and Proud Boys founder Gavin McInnes interviewed West and Fuentes on his podcast, with West saying that Hitler's reputation was crafted "by Jews." West further stated in the interview that society needed to be restructured around a Christian government, and that the media in the United States needed to be controlled by Christians, saying, "If you don't believe in Jesus Christ you are wrong."

Background

Previous efforts

On August 30, 2015, West announced at the MTV Video Music Awards that he would be running in the 2020 presidential election. The following month, on September 24, West reaffirmed to Vanity Fair that he was considering a 2020 presidential run. Although this did not appear poised to materialize in a campaign, on July 4, 2020, West announced a run on Twitter. On July 7, West was interviewed by Forbes about his presidential run, where he announced that his running mate will be Wyoming preacher Michelle Tidball, and that he would run as an independent under the "Birthday Party", explaining his decision of why he chose the name, saying, "Because when we win, it's everybody's 'birthday'." West also said he no longer supported Trump because he "hid in [a] bunker" during the COVID-19 pandemic. Continuing, he said, "You know? Obama's special. Trump's special. We say Kanye West is special. America needs special people that lead. Bill Clinton? Special. Joe Biden's not special." Various political pundits speculated that West's presidential run was a publicity stunt to promote his upcoming music. On July 15, 2020, official paperwork was filed with the Federal Election Commission for West, under the "BDY" Party affiliation amid claims that he was preparing to drop out. West held his first rally that weekend, on July 19.

West aligned himself with the philosophy of a consistent life ethic, a tenet of Christian democracy. West's platform has advocated for the creation of a culture of life, endorsing environmental stewardship, supporting the arts, buttressing faith-based organizations, restoring school prayer, and providing for a strong national defense, and "America First" diplomacy. In July 2020, West told Forbes that he is ignorant on issues such as taxes and foreign policy.

Campaign
On the morning of November 4, 2020, West conceded in a tweet that read "WELP KANYE 2024 🕊". In August 2021, West issued DONDA merchandise including a "$200 layered t-shirt that features both the presidential seal and the numbers '2024'". On November 20, 2022, West confirmed his candidacy for the presidency in 2024 while answering paparazzi questions, also revealing that far-right commentator Milo Yiannopoulos and live streamer Sneako were working for his campaign.

Trump–West–Fuentes meeting 
Within a few days after his announcement, West visited Donald Trump at Mar-a-Lago, along with political advisor Karen Giorno and controversial conservative commentator Nick Fuentes, who is a white nationalist and Holocaust denier. On November 24, West released a video in which he stated that Trump began screaming at him and telling him that he was going to lose after West asked Trump to be his vice-presidential candidate, stating:

In response, Trump released a statement that after contacting him earlier in the week to arrange the visit, West "unexpectedly showed up with three of his friends, whom I knew nothing about", with whom Trump dined, and that "the dinner was quick and uneventful". Trump further elaborated several days later that he met with Kanye to "help a seriously troubled man, who just happens to be black... who has been decimated in his business and virtually everything else". Trump also stated that he told West, "don't run for office, a total waste of time, can't win".

On November 28, 2022, YouTuber and political commentator Tim Pool interviewed West, Fuentes, and Yiannopoulos about West's future. Pool showed West an article posted about Mike Pence saying that Trump was wrong for allowing anti-Semitic people to eat with him at dinner, and demanding that he apologize.

On December 4, Yiannopoulos announced his resignation from the campaign.

Political positions

Abortion
As early as 2020, West has been adamantly opposed to abortion, believing it is "systematically [set up to] depopulate people of color," and has said women who choose to have children should be entitled to financial compensation. In a 2022 interview with Proud Boys founder Gavin McInnes, West has referred to abortion as "Eugenics" and "...[The] holocaust that we’re dealing with now."

Death penalty
In 2020, West said he was against capital punishment.

Education
West has called for a complete tearing down and reformation of the American education system many times over the last five years. During his 2018 visit to the White House, West criticized the American education system by stating "sometimes people say this kid has ADD, this kid has ADD. He don’t have ADD, school is boring! It was boring, it’s not as exciting as this. We have to make it more exciting, we have to mix curriculums to play basketball while you’re doing math.” He also criticized schools for not focusing on agriculture in his 2020 rally and during an interview with Lex Fridman in 2022 called for the history of The Holocaust and the mass genocide of 6,000,000 Jews in Nazi Germany to stop being taught in school.

Government, society, and economy
In the interview with McInnes, West advocated for removing Jewish people from positions of power and for firing them from influential positions. West has also advocated for a Christian-controlled state.

Gun control
During his only rally in 2020, West repeated a pro-gun-rights talking point—"Guns don't kill people, people kill people"—and expressed his opposition to gun control. West also made unsubstantiated reference to the idea that women in Israel are trained to use firearms.

Prison reform
In September 2018, West called for the alteration of the Thirteenth Amendment because of a loophole that suggests it is legal to enslave convicts. During a meeting with Trump the following month, West called the Thirteenth Amendment a "trap door". In October 2019, West stated during a performance with the Sunday Service Choir that people were too busy discussing music and sports instead of focusing on a broken system that he claims imprisons "one in three African-Americans...in this country." The following month, West alleged that the media calls him "crazy" to silence his opinion, connecting this to the incarceration of African-Americans and celebrities. On his album Jesus Is King (2019), West discussed the Thirteenth Amendment, mass incarceration, criticized the prison–industrial complex, and connected three-strikes laws to slavery.

Policing
In 2018 West expressed opposition to stop and frisk. During his 2022 interviews on Drink Champs and with Piers Morgan, he falsely claimed that George Floyd, an African-American man murdered by a police officer in 2020, was the victim of a fentanyl overdose.

Religious freedom
West supports sending federal funding to Christian organizations and restoring school prayer.

Welfare 
In May 2018, West made reference to the "Democratic plantation" theory, which argues that Black voters vote monolithically against their own interests in order to secure welfare assistance from Democrats. Specifically, he said welfare is a tool used by the Democratic Party to keep black Americans as an underclass that remains reliant on the party. During a September 2018 special guest appearance on Saturday Night Live, after the show had gone off the air, West alleged to the live crowd that the Democratic Party planned "to take the fathers out [of] the home and promote welfare."

The following month, West alleged that homicide was a byproduct of a "welfare state" that destroyed black families. Jelani Cobb challenged West's claim in The New Yorker (at least as much as it applied to Chicago), arguing that "the catalysts for violence in that city predate the 'welfare state' and the rise of single-parent black households, in the nineteen-seventies." He pointed to findings from Chicago Commission on Race Relations regarding the violence of the Chicago race riots of 1919 and a 1945 study entitled Black Metropolis, published by sociologists St. Clair Drake and Horace Cayton, which Cobb wrote, "detailed the ways in which discrimination in housing and employment were negatively affecting black migrants." He also noted similar observations made by W. E. B. Du Bois in Philadelphia, in 1903.

See also 

 African American–Jewish relations
 Black conservatism in the United States
 Christian nationalism in the United States
 Holocaust denial in the United States

References

2024 United States presidential campaigns
Black conservatism in the United States
Christian nationalism
Donald Trump controversies
Holocaust denial in the United States
Kanye West
Neo-Nazism in the United States
Opposition to the death penalty